This is a list of Slovenian football transfers for the winter transfer window. Only moves from Slovenian PrvaLiga are listed. The winter transfer window in Slovenia began on 15 January 2017 and closed on 16 February 2017.
Players without a club may join at any time, clubs may sign players on loan at any time.

Slovenian PrvaLiga

Players in

Players out

References

External links
Nogomania.com 
Footballdatabase.eu

Slovenian
2016–17 in Slovenian football
Lists of Slovenian football transfers